The Australian Research Council (ARC) Centre of Excellence for Plant Success in Nature and Agriculture (Centre for Plant Success) is a research centre that combines plant science, mathematics, genetics, agriculture, and law to learn more about what makes plants successful in different environments. The Centre aims to develop new, more effective ways of solving persistent problems in plant science by predicting and improving plant performance in diverse environments. Using quantitative and computational methods the Centre for Plant Success will link gene networks with traits to help address the problems of food security and climate change.

Awarded $35 million in funding by the ARC in 2020, the Centre is planned to run for seven years with Professor Christine Beveridge from The University of Queensland as the Centre Director.

Organisation 
The Centre for Plant Success is a collaboration between five Australian Universities - The University of Queensland, University of Tasmania, Queesland University of Technology, Monash University and Western Sydney University. Other collaborators and partners include:

 Bioplatforms Australia
 CSIRO
 Corteva agriscience
 The Crop Trust
 Stephanie Alexander Kitchen Garden Foundation
 CIMMYT
 The University of British Columbia
 Max Planck Institute of Molecular Plant Physiology
 Colorado State University
 University of Saskatchewan
 Harvard University
Institute of Genetics And Developmental Biology Chinese Academy of Science

References

External links 
Official website

Research institutes in Australia